Karl Jensen is the name of

 Karl Jensen (painter) (1851–1933), Danish painter
 Karl Jensen (athlete) (1898–1928), Danish discus and hammer thrower
 Karl Julius Jensen (1888-1965), Danish long-distance runner

See also 

 Carl Jensen (disambiguation)